David Boyd (born March 7, 1951) is a Canadian author residing in St. Stephen, New Brunswick. He is a retired English and Media teacher at Appleby College. He writes a historical fiction series on World War II, "The Reflecting Man," for adults as D.K.R. Boyd. and for children/YA readers as David Boyd. As a playwright, Boyd adapted Shakespeare's Macbeth to create Macbeth: A Multimedia Event (1995) and Julius Caesar to create Caesar: A Multimedia Event (2005). In 1996, his Young Adult novel Bottom Drawer was nominated for a Governor General's Award.  He also writes dystopian fiction under the pseudonym of David Collins. He is the brother of economist Dr. Lorraine Eden.

Bibliography
 The Face in the Flames – 1989, reprinted 1998
Spellbound! – 1990, reprinted 1998
The Danger Beneath – 1990, reprinted 1998
Earthwatch – 1990, reprinted 1998
Looking for a Hero – 1993; e-book edition 2013
Champlain Summer – 1993
Bottom Drawer – 1996 (Nominated for a Governor General's Award); e-book edition 2013
On The Lines: The Adventures of a Linesman in the N.H.L. (co-authored with Ron Finn) – 1993
Leonardo’s Wings – 2005; e-book edition June 2013
Little Sure Shot – 2005; e-book edition June 2013
Khan of Khans – 2005; e-book edition June 2013
Marco Polo and the Roc – 2006
The Hidden Message – 2006
Pearl Harbor – 2006
Beware the Vikings – 2006
Napoleon's Land Stand – 2006
Hannibal – 2006
Pearl of the Tsars – 2007
Battle of Queenston Heights – 2007
Closer To Hamlet – 2010
Aftermath – 2010 (eBook edition); 2020 - KDP edition
Runner – 2010 (eBook edition); 2020 - KDP edition
The Grief Team – (as David Collins) – March 2013 (Kindle edition)
My Mom Always Yells Too Loud in the Arena and Other Poems about Hockey – April 2013 (Apple iBook edition)
Suleyman's Library – e-book edition June 2013
Good Queen Bess – e-book edition June 2013
Heart Of A Lion – e-book edition June 2013
The Reflecting Man: Volume One – trade paperback and e-book edition July 2013
The Reflecting Man: Volume Two – trade paperback and e-book edition April 2015
The Reflecting Man: Volume Three – trade paperback and e-book edition May 2017
The Reflecting Man: Volume Four – trade paperback and e-book edition April 2020

References 
 http://www.davidboyd.ca/
 https://web.archive.org/web/20071028144801/http://www.umanitoba.ca/cm/profiles/boyd.html
 http://www.appleby.on.ca/page.cfm?p=2347
 https://www.ic.gc.ca/eic/site/pmate-ppmee.nsf/eng/wz00593.html
 http://www.independentauthornetwork.com/dkr-boyd.html
 https://web.archive.org/web/20170423151910/http://www.fox8live.com/story/35182074/critically-acclaimed-author-dkr-boyd-continues-page-turning-historical-fiction-series

External links 
 https://web.archive.org/web/20071028144801/http://www.umanitoba.ca/cm/profiles/boyd.html

Canadian children's writers
Living people
Writers from New Brunswick
People from St. Stephen, New Brunswick
1951 births